JASPAR is an open access and widely used database of manually curated, non-redundant transcription factor (TF) binding profiles stored as position frequency matrices (PFM) and transcription factor flexible models (TFFM) for TFs from species in six taxonomic groups. From the supplied PFMs, users may generate position-specific weight matrices (PWM). The JASPAR database was introduced in 2004. There were seven major updates and new releases in 2006, 2008, 2010, 2014, 2016, 2018, 2020 and 2022, which is the latest release of JASPAR.

Availability 

The JASPAR database is an open-source and freely available for scientific community at http://jaspar.genereg.net/.

Similar databases 
 TRANSFAC – Transcription Factor Database
 HOCOMOCO - HOmo sapiens COmprehensive MOdel COllection
 PAZAR - Database with focus on experimentally validated transcription factor binding sites
 TFe – the transcription factor encyclopedia
 AnimalTFDB – Animal transcription factor database
 PlantCARE – cis-regulatory elements and transcription factors in plants (2002)
 RegTransBase - transcription factor binding sites in a diverse set of bacteria.
 RegulonDB – Primary database on transcriptional regulation in Escherichia coli
 TRRD – Transcription Regulatory Regions Database, mainly about regulatory regions and TF-binding sites
 PlantRegMap Plant Transcriptional Regulatory Map

References 

Transcription factors
Scientific databases